This is a list of college football coaches with 100 career losses. "College level" is defined as a four-year college or university program in either the National Association of Intercollegiate Athletics or the National Collegiate Athletic Association. If the team competed at a time before the official organization of either of the two groups but is generally accepted as a "college football program" it would also be included.

Individuals indicated in bold type are expected to remain coaching in the next college football season of 2016.

The List of coaches is current as of the end of the 2015 season.

Details

Active coaches
Fifteen coaches on the list are considered "active" for the 2016 season.

Most total losses
As of the start of the 2020 season, Watson Brown is the all-time leader in career losses with a total of 211.

Win percentage
John Gagliardi leads the list in terms of winning percentage at .775. A total of seventy-eight coaches have made the list and still maintained a winning percentage of .500 or above as of 2015. A. C. Burcky has the lowest winning percentage on the list with .293, having only 41 wins, 110 losses, and 16 ties.

List of college football coaches with 100 losses

See also
 List of college football coaches with 200 wins
 List of college football coaches with 20 ties
 List of college football coaches with 0 career wins
 List of college football coaches with 30 seasons
 List of college football coaches with a .750 winning percentage

Notes

References

100 career losses